Brendan Landers (born 25 January 1978) is an Irish retired hurler who played as a goalkeeper for the Waterford senior team.

Born in Lismore, County Waterford, Landers first played competitive hurling in his youth. He was a Harty Cup runner-up with Lismore CBS while simultaneously enjoying championship success at under-age levels with the Lismore club. Landers subsequently joined the Lismore senior team.

Landers made his debut on the inter-county scene when he first linked up with the Waterford minor team. A Munster runner-up in this grade, he later lined out with the under-21 team. Landers joined the senior team during the 1997 Waterford Crystal League. He went on to play a key role for Waterford as goalkeeper.

As a member of the unsuccessful Munster inter-provincial team in 1998, Landers never won a Railway Cup medal. Throughout his inter-county career he made 11 championship appearances. Landers retired from inter-county hurling prior to the start of the 2002 league.

In retirement from playing Landers became involved in club management and coaching, including a spell as manager of the Lismore camogie team.

References

1978 births
Living people
Lismore hurlers
Waterford inter-county hurlers
Munster inter-provincial hurlers
Hurling goalkeepers